Cooney Dam is a dam in Carbon County, Montana, that creates Cooney Reservoir.

It impounds Red Lodge Creek for irrigation water storage. The dam is owned and operated by the Montana Department of Natural Resources and Conservation.

Recreation includes boating, camping, hiking, and fishing for walleye and rainbow trout. The state maintains the adjacent Cooney State Park.

References

Dams in Montana
Reservoirs in Montana
United States state-owned dams
Buildings and structures in Carbon County, Montana
Dams completed in 1937
Landforms of Carbon County, Montana
1937 establishments in Montana